Agrioglypta itysalis is a moth of the family Crambidae. It is found in Asia, including India and Borneo.

The wingspan is about 30 mm. The forewings are brown with white patches and the hindwings are white with a broad brown margin. It looks similar to Glyphodes bivitralis.

References

Spilomelinae
Moths described in 1859
Moths of Asia